Peter Nellen (10 August 1912 – 29 December 1969) was a German politician and former member of the German Bundestag.

Career 
He was a member of the German Bundestag from its first election in 1949 to 1969. From 1949 to 1961 he represented the constituency of Münster-Stadt und -Land as a directly elected member.

Literature

References

1912 births
1988 deaths
Members of the Bundestag for North Rhine-Westphalia
Members of the Bundestag 1965–1969
Members of the Bundestag 1961–1965
Members of the Bundestag 1957–1961
Members of the Bundestag 1953–1957
Members of the Bundestag 1949–1953
Members of the Bundestag for the Christian Democratic Union of Germany
Members of the Bundestag for the Social Democratic Party of Germany
People from Düren
People from the Rhine Province